Trifluoroacetone (1,1,1-trifluoroacetone) is an organofluorine compound with the chemical formula CF3C(O)CH3. The compound is a colorless liquid with chloroform-like odour.

Preparation, reactions, uses
Trifluoroacetone is produced by decarboxylation of trifluoroacetoacetic acid:
CF3C(O)CH2CO2H → CF3C(O)CH3 + CO2
The acetoacetic acid in turn is obtained via condensation of acetate and trifluoroacetate esters.

Trifluoroacetone has been examined as oxidizing agent in Oppenauer oxidation, in which case hydroxyl groups of secondary alcohols can be oxidized in the presence of hydroxy groups of primary alcohols.

Trifluoracetone is also used in a synthesis of 2-trifluoromethyl-7-azaindoles starting with 2,6-dihalopyridines. The derived chiral imine is used to prepare enantiopure α-trifluoromethyl alanines and diamines by a Strecker reaction followed by either nitrile hydrolysis or reduction.

See also
Hexafluoroacetone

References

External links
Safety sheet

Trifluoromethyl compounds
Ketones
Trifluoromethyl ketones